The music education policy roundtable is a music education advocacy and public policy group made up of an alliance of organizations dedicated to ensuring the presence and perseverance of school music programs operated by certified music educators teaching sequential, standards-based music education to students across the nation.  It was founded in June 2012 by the National Association for Music Education (NAfME) and American String Teachers Association (ASTA).  The organization was formalized in June 2012 with a roundtable discussion in front of the executive members of the fifty state music education organizations. The group lobbies the government for higher music education standards a few times a year.

The alliance of organizations that sit on the round table include:
 VH1 Save the Music Foundation
 The Recording Academy
 American Choral Directors Association
 American Orff-Schulwerk Association
 American String Teachers Association
 Chorus America
 Drum Corps International
 Education Through Music
 Gordon Institute for Music Learning
 GRAMMY Foundation
 Innovate School Music (iSchoolMusic.org)
 League of American Orchestras
 Music Teachers National Association
 National Association for Music Education
 National Association of Music Merchants (NAMM) 
 National Music Council
 Organization of American Kodály Educators
 Percussive Arts Society
 Phi Mu Alpha
 Quadrant Arts Education Research

Inaugural Members 
The very first meeting of the original “Music Education Policy Roundtable,” took place on February 7, 2011  at the NafME Headquarters (then MENC:  The National Association for Music Education). This was prior to its formalization as a coalition, the inaugural members included::

 Michael A. Butera – National Association for Music Education (then MENC:  The National Association for Music Education)
 Mike Blakeslee – National Association for Music Education (then MENC:  The National Association for Music Education)
 Marlynn Likens – National Association for Music Education (then MENC:  The National Association for Music Education)
 Chris Woodside – National Association for Music Education (then MENC:  The National Association for Music Education)
 Nancy Townes – National Association for Music Education (then MENC:  The National Association for Music Education)
 Donna Sizemore Hale – American String Teachers Association
 Mary Jane Dye – American String Teachers Association
 Deb Bissen – American String Teachers Association
 Laurie Lock – VH1 Save the Music Foundation
 Chris Purifoy - Innovate School Music (iSchoolMusic.org)
 Narric Rome – Americans for the Arts
 Heather Noonan – League of American Orchestras
 Catherine Davies – Chorus America
 Sam Hope – National Association of Schools of Music
 Leo Coco – Nelson Mullins Riley & Scarborough, LLP

References 
 http://advocacy.nafme.org/the-music-education-policy-roundtable/
 https://web.archive.org/web/20150429235258/http://blog.ischoolmusic.org/blog/ism-joins-the-nafme-roundtable-for-advocacy-in-the-fight-for.html
 http://advocacy.nafme.org/the-music-education-policy-roundtable/
 https://web.archive.org/web/20130225155601/http://www.aosa.org/mepr.html
 https://archive.today/20130411184946/http://www.sbomagazine.com/431262/news/quadrant-arts-education-research-joins-music-education-policy-roundtable/
 http://www.grammy.org/news/academy-joins-music-education-policy-roundtable
 http://www.restoringmusic.org/musiceducationpolicyroundtable
 https://web.archive.org/web/20140920110842/http://www.chrispurifoy.com/about/
 http://www.musiccouncil.org/national-music-council-and-music-education-policy-roundtable-summary-recent-hill-education-activities/
 http://www.amparents.org/music-education-policy-roundtable-calls-on-candidates/

Music education organizations